William David Young (born 25 November 1951) is a Scottish former footballer. Playing as a defender, he featured for Aberdeen, Tottenham Hotspur, Arsenal, Nottingham Forest, Norwich City, Brighton & Hove Albion and Darlington throughout his career.

Club career
A large, physically intimidating centre back from Heriot near Edinburgh, Young attended Ross High School in Tranent. Nicknamed "Big Willie", he first played professionally for Aberdeen, all in all making 187 appearances for the Dons between 1970 and 1975. He was signed by Tottenham Hotspur in September 1975, and while playing under Terry Neill made 64 appearances for Spurs in two seasons. In March 1977, Young once again signed for manager Neill so as to link up at Highbury with Spurs' arch-rivals Arsenal.

Young immediately became a regular in the Arsenal first team, and played in all of the Gunners' trio of FA Cup finals; after losing to Ipswich Town in 1978, Young was on the winning side the following year, with a 3–2 defeat of Manchester United. Young was a runner up in the 1980 FA Cup Final, where he made an infamous tackle on West Ham United's Paul Allen and also a runner up in the 1980 European Cup Winners' Cup Final.

Young continued to be Arsenal's first choice centre back until the 1981–82 season, when he lost his place to Chris Whyte. Having played 237 times and scoring 19 goals for Arsenal, the 30-year-old Young then joined Nottingham Forest in December 1981 for £50,000, and played 59 times over two seasons there.

In 1983, he joined Norwich City, but with injuries dogging him, he failed to secure a regular place in the side. He then had short spells at Brighton and Hove, followed by Darlington before his retirement from the game in November 1984.

International career
He was capped 5 times, scoring one goal for Scotland's U23s. Young never played a full international for Scotland having been banned for life after an incident in a Copenhagen nightclub in 1975.

Personal life
As a player at Aberdeen, Young worked on oil rigs during the summer to top up his earnings. He is married to Lynda; they have three children. After retiring from football he spent 19 years running a pub called Bramcote Manor near Nottingham, and then bought kennels in Bottesford, Leicestershire.

Honours
Arsenal
FA Cup: winner 1978–79
Runner-up 1977–78, 1979–80
European Cup Winners' Cup: Runner up 1979–80

References

External links
Career information at ex-canaries.co.uk

1951 births
Living people
Footballers from Edinburgh
Association football central defenders
Scottish footballers
Sportspeople from the Scottish Borders
Arsenal F.C. players
Brighton & Hove Albion F.C. players
Darlington F.C. players
Norwich City F.C. players
Nottingham Forest F.C. players
Tottenham Hotspur F.C. players
Scottish Football League players
English Football League players
Scotland under-23 international footballers
FA Cup Final players
People educated at Ross High School, Tranent